Two and a Half Men is an American television sitcom that originally aired on CBS for twelve seasons from September 22, 2003, to February 19, 2015. Originally starring Charlie Sheen in the lead role alongside Jon Cryer and Angus T. Jones, the series was about a hedonistic jingle writer, Charlie Harper, his uptight brother, Alan, and Alan's mischievous son, Jake. As Alan's marriage falls apart and divorce appears imminent, he and Jake move into Charlie's beachfront Malibu house and complicate Charlie's freewheeling life.

In 2010, CBS and Warner Bros. Television reached a multiyear broadcasting agreement for the series, renewing it through at least the 2011–12 season. In February 2011, however, CBS and Warner Bros. decided to end production for the rest of the eighth season after Sheen entered drug rehabilitation and made "disparaging" comments about the series' creator and executive producer Chuck Lorre. Sheen's contract was terminated the following month and he was written out of the show after it was confirmed that he would not be returning to the series. Ashton Kutcher was hired to replace him the following season as Walden Schmidt, a billionaire who buys Charlie's house after his death.

In April 2013, CBS renewed the series for an eleventh season after closing one-year deals with Kutcher and Cryer. Jones, who was attending college, was relegated to recurring status but did not make an appearance until the series finale. He was replaced by Jenny (Amber Tamblyn), Charlie's previously unknown daughter. In March 2014, CBS renewed the series for a twelfth season, which was later announced to be the series' last. The season began airing in October 2014 and concluded in February 2015 with the 40-minute series finale "Of Course He's Dead". The success of the series led to it being the third-highest revenue-generating program for 2012, earning $3.24 million an episode.

Overview 

The series revolved initially around the lives of the Harper brothers, Charlie and Alan, and Alan's son Jake. Charlie is a bachelor who writes commercial jingles for a living, while leading a hedonistic lifestyle. When Alan's wife, Judith, decides to divorce him, he moves into Charlie's Malibu beach house, with Jake coming to stay over the weekends. Charlie's housekeeper is Berta (Conchata Ferrell), a sardonic woman who initially resents the change to the household, but eventually accepts it. Charlie's one-night stand Rose (Melanie Lynskey) was first introduced as his stalker in the pilot episode.

The first five seasons find Charlie in casual sexual misadventures with numerous women until the sixth season, when he becomes engaged to Chelsea, but the relationship does not last, as Chelsea breaks off their engagement. Afterwards, Charlie flies to Paris with his stalker Rose in the show's de facto eighth-season finale. However, in the ninth-season premiere, Charlie was said to have died after he was struck by a Paris subway train. Hints were made that Rose threw Charlie into the train's path after learning that he had cheated on her.

Alan's experiences are somewhat different. Throughout the series, Alan continues to deal with his son Jake's growing up and the aftermath of his bitter divorce, while having little success with women. His marriage to Kandi (April Bowlby) at the end of the third season was short-lived. In the fourth season, Alan is back at the beach house paying alimony to two women out of his low earnings as a chiropractor. In the seventh season, he begins a relationship with Lyndsey McElroy (Courtney Thorne-Smith), the mother of one of Jake's friends. Their relationship is temporarily suspended when Alan cheats on her, and accidentally burns down her house, but the relationship eventually resumes.

In the ninth-season premiere (after Charlie's death), the beach house is sold to Walden Schmidt (Ashton Kutcher), an Internet billionaire going through a divorce from Bridget (Judy Greer). Alan leaves to live with his mother Evelyn (Holland Taylor) when the house is sold, but Walden invites both Alan and Jake back to live in the beach house. Walden is lonely, and the three form a close surrogate family.

At the end of the ninth season, Jake joins the US Army; he appears occasionally during season 10, briefly dating Tammy (Jaime Pressly), who is 17 years his senior and has three kids, as well as Tammy's daughter Ashley (Emily Osment). In the 10th season, Walden proposes to his English girlfriend Zoey (Sophie Winkleman), only to be turned down and discovers she has another man. He becomes depressed. Meanwhile, Alan gets engaged to his girlfriend Lyndsey, while Judith leaves her second husband Herb Melnick (Ryan Stiles) (to whom she had been married since the fourth season) after he cheats on her with his receptionist (they later reconcile). Alan and Lyndsey's relationship of three years ends as she wants to move on. Rose returns and briefly dates Walden, later stalking him as she did to Charlie. Walden begins to date a poor but ambitious woman named Kate (Brooke D'Orsay) and changes his name to "Sam Wilson", pretending to be poor to find someone who wants him for him, not for his money. They later break up when he reveals who he really is, though Kate realizes that Walden's money helped her become a successful clothing designer. Jake announces he is being shipped to Japan for at least a year, so he and Alan go on a father-son bonding trip. Other than a cameo in the series finale, this is the last time Jake appears on the show, though verbal references are made to him.

In the 11th season, a young woman arrives at the beach house, announcing that she is Charlie Harper's biological daughter, Jenny (Amber Tamblyn). She moves in with Walden and Alan, and later displays many of Charlie's traits, including a love of women and alcohol. Lyndsey begins dating a man named Larry (D. B. Sweeney).  In an attempt to learn more about Larry, Alan takes on the pseudonym "Jeff Strongman". His double-life becomes complicated when "Jeff" begins dating Larry's sister, Gretchen (Kimberly Williams-Paisley).

In the 12th season, after a health scare, Walden decides to reprioritize his life by adopting a baby. He realizes that the only way to do this is to be married, but does not know anyone who will marry him.  He asks Alan to marry him and pretend that they are a gay couple, thus ensuring success at adopting. Jenny moves out of the house, and moves in with Evelyn, due to Walden and Alan’s preparing to adopt. They adopt a child, Louis (Edan Alexander), and subsequently divorce to pursue relationships with women. Alan proposes to Lyndsey a second time and she accepts, while Walden begins a relationship with Louis' social worker, Ms. McMartin (Maggie Lawson). Charlie is revealed to be alive, having been kept prisoner by Rose until escaping, but he is killed before he can reunite with Walden and Alan.

Production

Sheen's dismissal and replacement 
Following a February 2010 announcement that Sheen was entering drug rehabilitation, filming of the show was put on hiatus, but resumed the following month. On April 1, 2010, People reported that after seven seasons, Sheen announced he was considering leaving the show. According to one source, Sheen quit the show after filming the final episode of season seven, purportedly due to his rejection of CBS's offer of $1 million per episode as too low. Sheen eventually stated that he would be back for two more seasons. On May 18, 2010, the New Zealand website Stuff.co.nz reported that a press release issued by Sheen's publicist confirmed that Sheen had signed a new contract for two years at $1.78 million per episode. "To put a fitting end on the two and one-half months of whirlwind speculation, I'm looking forward to returning to my CBS home on Monday nights," Sheen was quoted as saying.

On January 28, 2011, Sheen voluntarily entered a rehabilitation center for the third time in 12 months. According to Warner Bros. Television and CBS, the show was put on hiatus for an indefinite period of time.

The following month, after Sheen's verbal denunciations of Chuck Lorre in a radio interview with Alex Jones and an online interview with TMZ.com, CBS announced that Two and a Half Men would cease production for the rest of its eighth season. This affected an estimated 200 employees, and caused Warner Bros., CBS, Lorre, Sheen and other profit participants an estimated $10 million loss from the unmade eight remaining episodes. Afterward, Sheen was interviewed on ABC's 20/20, NBC's Today and CNN's Piers Morgan Tonight, where he continued to criticize Lorre and CBS. On March 7, CBS and Warner Bros. Television jointly announced that they had terminated Sheen's Two and a Half Men contract, citing "moral turpitude" as a main cause of separation. No further decisions about the show's future were released.

Cast members Marin Hinkle and Holland Taylor expressed sadness at Sheen's departure and personal problems. Jon Cryer did not publicly comment on the matter. In response, Sheen called him "a turncoat, a traitor, [and] a troll" in an E! Online interview, although he later issued a "half-apology" to Cryer for the remarks. Sheen sued Lorre and Warner Bros. Television for $100 million, saying that he had filed the lawsuit on behalf of himself and Two and a Half Men'''s cast and crew; however, only Sheen was named as a plaintiff in court documents.

In April 2011, Sheen mentioned during a radio interview during his tour's stop in Boston that CBS and he were discussing a possible return to the show. Lorre announced the same month that he had developed an idea for a revival of Two and a Half Men, excluding Sheen, with Cryer in a key role alongside a new character. Hugh Grant was approached to replace Sheen but he declined. On May 13, CBS announced Ashton Kutcher would join the cast. Kutcher stated, "I can't replace Charlie Sheen, but I'm going to work my ass off to entertain the hell out of people!"

On August 2, 2011, it was reported that the season nine premiere would begin with Sheen's character killed off and his ex-girlfriends attending his funeral. Afterward, Charlie's Malibu home would be put up for sale; interested buyers would include celebrities from Lorre's other sitcoms and John Stamos, as well as Kutcher's character, Walden Schmidt, "an Internet billionaire with a broken heart." Reviewers compared the situation to what happened in 1987 to Valerie Harper, who was fired from the sitcom Valerie (later titled Valerie's Family: The Hogans and then The Hogan Family). Her character was killed off-screen and she was replaced the following season.

Sheen said he would watch his "fake funeral attended by [his] fake ex-girlfriends, from [his] very, very real movie theater, with [his] very real hotties in tow." His response to the season-nine premiere was very positive. He reportedly felt Charlie Harper's funeral was "eerie but fun", and that the introduction of Kutcher's character in a cloud of his own character's ashes was particularly enjoyable.

The attention Two and a Half Men received due to the change in characters gave the series a boost. Average total viewers during the 2011–2012 season rose 13% to 15 million and the 5.2 rating in the 18–49 demographic rose by 27%. Kutcher's debut as Walden Schmidt, in the episode "Nice to Meet You, Walden Schmidt", was seen by 28.7 million people on September 19, 2011. The Nielsen company reported it the highest-rated episode since the series began. At the 2012 Emmys, Two and a Half Men was nominated for four awards and won three, the most Emmys it had won in a single year since it began. In 2012, Kutcher replaced Sheen as the highest-paid U.S. actor currently on the air, receiving $700,000 per episode. For Kutcher's second season, the show moved to the 8:30 pm Thursday time slot, replacing Rules of Engagement. Two and a Half Men improved ratings for the time slot, which were up from the previous year. Jennifer Graham Kizer of IVillage thought that the series changed tone in its Kutcher era, saying it felt "less evil". Lorre, Cryer, Hinkle, Taylor, Ferrell and Lynskey had nothing but praise for Kutcher, believing he had "saved the show".

Kutcher was the highest-paid actor on television for four years according to Forbes, earning an estimated $24 million between June 2012 and June 2013, $750,000 per episode. Cryer was the second-highest-paid star on American television, earning $600,000–700,000 per episode.

In 2021, Sheen expressed regret for his past behavior, saying "There [were] 55 different ways for me to handle that situation and I chose number 56."

 Jones' departure 
In a November 2012 interview with a Christian website, Angus T. Jones (Jake) said he had recently converted to Christianity and joined a Seventh-day Adventist church. He attacked the show as "filth that contradicts his moral values" and said that he was "sick of being a part of it". He also begged fans to stop watching the show. Producers explained that Jones was not expected back on the set until 2013, because his character was not scheduled to appear in the final two episodes before the winter hiatus. In response to the controversy, Sheen issued a public statement in which he blamed Chuck Lorre for the outburst and claimed that "Jones' outburst isn’t an isolated incident but rather a symptom of the toxic environment surrounding the show." The following day, Jones issued a public apology for his remarks and explained that he "cannot address everything that has been said or right every misstatement or misunderstanding." Jones left the series at the end of the 2012–2013 season and did not appear in season 11 despite initial reports that he would continue in a recurring, rather than a starring, role. The role of youngest family member was filled by Amber Tamblyn, who played Jenny, the long-lost illegitimate daughter of Charlie Harper; and later by Edan Alexander, who played Louis, Walden Schmidt's adopted son. On March 18, 2014, Jones officially announced his departure from the show, stating he had been "a paid hypocrite". Nevertheless, he apologized to Lorre for his actions and appeared in a cameo in the series finale on February 19, 2015.

 Cast and characters 

 Main 
 Charlie Sheen as Charlie Harper (seasons 1–8), a hedonistic bachelor, former rock musician-turned-jingle/children's songwriter, Alan's elder brother, Jake's uncle and Jenny's father. Despite his arrogant and rambunctious demeanor, he does possess a kind heart, though he very rarely shows it. He is written out of the series at the beginning of season nine, after being pushed in front of a train and killed offscreen, due to Charlie Sheen being fired from the show. In the episode "Why We Gave Up Women", Charlie's ghost, portrayed by Kathy Bates, visits Alan and is forced to spend eternity in hell as a woman with a pair of testicles. He has a daughter named Jenny, whose existence he never disclosed to his family. In season 11, she resurfaces as an adult, but has no idea he had died. The series finale abandons the idea that Charlie is deceased by revealing that Rose faked his death and held him prisoner in a pit for four years. Brainwashed into a violent psychopath, he escapes and portends his imminent arrival by sending threats to Alan, Evelyn and Walden, as well as generous checks to Jake, Berta, Jenny and his ex-girlfriends, but a helicopter drops a grand piano on him and kills him just before he enters the beach house.
 Jon Cryer as Alan Harper, Charlie's younger brother, a struggling chiropractor, Jake's twice-divorced father, Walden's best friend and Jenny's uncle. Alan is intelligent, a graduate of Cal State Long Beach but continually stricken with bad luck due to poor choices and mistakes, which are due to a lifetime of suffering from Charlie's abuse and Evelyn's neglect, as well as favoring Charlie over him. Due to a lack in income (partly the result of Charlie's sabotaging Alan's divorce-settlement by jilting Alan's lawyer in the episode "No Sniffing, No Wowing"), Alan is forced to sponge off people throughout his life, but he genuinely cares about others despite this. His poverty ultimately led to the demise of his business. In the 12th and final season, Alan agrees to "marry" Walden for the latter to adopt a child and for months, the two pretend to be a gay couple. In the series' penultimate episode, Walden and Alan end the marriage as Walden had successfully adopted a six-year-old named Louis. Alan finally proposes to Lyndsey and agrees to marry her (as well as move out) in the final episodes. Cryer is the only cast member who appears in all 262 episodes of the series.
 Angus T. Jones as Jake Harper (seasons 1–10; guest, season 12), the slacker son of Alan and Judith and older half-brother (or brother, if Alan's paternity claim is to be believed) of Milly and cousin of Jenny. In season one, episode 17 ("Ate the Hamburgers, Wearing the Hats"), his real name is revealed to actually be Jacob. As he grows older, he changes from a rather bright (but gullible), independent child into a dimwitted buffoon. He eventually enlists in the U.S. Army working as a chef. At the end of season 10, he announces that he is going to Japan for a year. Despite his absence, he is mentioned often in seasons 11 and 12 and makes an uncredited cameo via archive footage in season 12, as well as returning briefly in person in the series finale.
 Ashton Kutcher as Walden Schmidt (seasons 9–12), Alan's best friend, roommate and ephemeral husband. A friendly, hopelessly romantic internet tycoon, he is a billionaire despite being somewhat immature and naïve for most of his life. He purchases the Harper beach house after Charlie's death. During his time in the household, he grows into a responsible adult and forms close friendships with Jake, Herb, Berta, Judith, Evelyn and Jenny. He also serves as a surrogate uncle figure to Jake, in place of Charlie. In season 12, he and Alan adopt a six-year-old boy named Louis.
 Holland Taylor as Evelyn Harper (seasons 1–9; recurring, seasons 10–12), Charlie and Alan's vain mother and the grandmother of Jake and Jenny. A high-powered Los Angeles broker/realtor, she sleeps with both men and women.
 Marin Hinkle as Judith Harper-Melnick (seasons 1–9; recurring, seasons 10–12), Alan's selfish, mean-spirited ex-wife and Jake and Milly's mother. She considers Charlie’s lifestyle and attitude to be a bad example for Jake and also occasionally has issues with Alan’s own parenting practices.
 Conchata Ferrell as Berta (seasons 2–12; recurring, season 1), the family's outspoken housekeeper and close family friend. She shows great animosity towards Alan and Jake, while she adores Charlie and later, Walden. During the Kutcher years, her role was increased on the show, appearing in more episodes. Season 11 was the first season where she appeared in every episode. The role was originally only intended for a two-episode arc in the first season, in which she would leave as a result of Alan and his son moving in.
 Melanie Lynskey as Rose (seasons 1–2; recurring, seasons 3–12), the Harpers' strange neighbor and Charlie's stalker and friend. Initially, Charlie hated Rose and wanted nothing to do with her, but eventually they became friends and he later fell in love with her. In the ninth-season premiere, Rose claimed that Charlie "slipped" in front of a Paris Métro train after she had caught him cheating on her. She was later seen taking Bridget Schmidt under her wing as an apprentice stalker, but this storyline was eventually aborted. After formally meeting Walden at the local tavern, Rose rushed into a relationship with him and caused her ferrets to attack Walden and Alan when Walden broke up with her. Naturally, she continues to stalk Walden, as well as the Harpers, despite Charlie's apparent death. In the finale,  she is revealed to have kept Charlie imprisoned in a pit for four years.
 April Bowlby as Kandi (season 4; recurring, season 3; guest, seasons 10 and 12), Charlie's dimwitted girlfriend, then later as Alan's girlfriend and second wife and also Judith's best friend (for one episode). In season 10, after Alan rejects her sexual advances, she has a one-night stand with Alan's girlfriend, Lyndsey McElroy.
 Jennifer Taylor as Chelsea (season 7; recurring, season 6; guest, seasons 9 and 12), Charlie's girlfriend for most of season six, she has moved into his house by the end of the season. She then becomes Charlie's fiancée in season seven. They later end the relationship, which deeply hurt Charlie for a while. She is absent throughout season eight, but makes a brief, speaking cameo at Charlie's funeral in season nine. (While credited on-screen among the main cast during the seventh season, CBS press releases billed her as a recurring character.)
 Amber Tamblyn as Jenny (season 11; recurring, season 12), Charlie's long-lost illegitimate daughter who shares many personality traits with her father, including indulging in alcohol and women. On October 2, 2013, after the season-11 premiere had aired, Tamblyn was promoted to a series regular. Walden and she have a very good relationship and she playfully flirts and flaunts her female lovers in front of him to make him embarrassed. (While credited on-screen among the main cast during the 12th season, CBS press releases bill her as a recurring character.)
 Edan Alexander as Louis (season 12), a six-year-old boy whom Walden adopts.

 Recurring 
The following appeared in recurring roles or story arcs spanning multiple episodes:

 Jane Lynch as the sarcastic Dr. Linda Freeman, originally Jake's child psychologist and later Charlie's regular psychiatrist who later also treats Alan and Walden (seasons 1, 3–9, 11)
 Ryan Stiles as Herb Melnick, a pediatrician who becomes Judith's second ex-husband (seasons 2, 4–10, 12)
 Rebecca McFarland as Leanne, Pavlov's bartender (seasons 1–10)
 J. D. Walsh as Gordon, a pizza delivery guy who idolizes Charlie's lifestyle (seasons 1–4, 6–8)
 Emmanuelle Vaugier as Mia, Charlie's ex-fiancée (seasons 3, 5–7 9, and 12)
 Robert Wagner as Nathan Krunk (alias "Teddy Leopold"), Evelyn's fifth husband, thought to be Courtney's father, but later revealed to be a con artist (seasons 4–5)
 Ming-Na Wen as the Hon. Linda Harris, superior court judge, adjunct law professor and Charlie's girlfriend (season 5)
 Jenny McCarthy as Sylvia Fishman (alias "Courtney Leopold"), alleged daughter of Nathan Krunk (alias "Teddy Leopold") (seasons 5, 8–9)
 Martin Mull as Russell, Charlie's self-medicating pharmacist (seasons 6–10)
 Kelly Stables as Melissa, Alan's receptionist, who dates both Charlie and Alan (seasons 6–8)
 Tinashe Kachingwe as Celeste Burnette, Jake's girlfriend whose father strongly disapproves of their relationship (seasons 6–7)
 Graham Patrick Martin as Eldridge McElroy, Lyndsey's son and Jake's equally dim-witted best friend (seasons 7–9)
 Courtney Thorne-Smith as Lyndsey McElroy, Alan's on/off love interest from season seven on and his fiancée in season 12. In season 10, she has a one-night stand with Kandi (Alan's ex-wife) (seasons 7–12)
 Carl Reiner as Marty Pepper, Evelyn's boyfriend and later husband (seasons 7–8, 11)
 Judy Greer as Bridget, Walden's ex-wife (seasons 9–12); also played Myra Melnick, Herb Melnick's sister and Charlie's one-night fling (season 4)
 Mimi Rogers as Robin Schmidt, Walden's mother (season 9–12)
 Sophie Winkleman as Zoey Hyde-Tottingham-Pierce, Walden's love interest following his divorce from Bridget (seasons 9–10, 12)
 Talyan Wright as Ava Pierce, Zoey's seven-year-old daughter (seasons 9–10)
 Patton Oswalt as Billy Stanhope, Walden's former business partner who dates Bridget (seasons 9–10)
 Brooke D'Orsay as Kate, Walden's love interest (seasons 10–11); also played Robin, Charlie's sex partner (season 4, episode 16)
 Missi Pyle as Miss Dolores Pasternak, Jake's teacher (seasons 2, 7, 9 and 12; played by Alicia Witt in season 6)
 Macey Cruthird as Megan, Jake's math tutor and later girlfriend (seasons 8–9)
 D. B. Sweeney as Larry Martin, a good friend of Alan and Walden's, who incidentally, was Lyndsey's boyfriend after Alan (seasons 11–12)
 Miley Cyrus as Missi, an old family friend of Walden's, who becomes Jake's brief love interest (season 10)
 Odette Annable as Nicole, brief love interest of Walden and majority owner of a garage-based tech start-up Walden joins (season 11)
 Clark Duke as Barry Foster, Nicole's business partner who befriends Walden (seasons 11–12)
 Aly Michalka as Brooke, Jenny's girlfriend (season 11)
 Kimberly Williams-Paisley as Gretchen Martin, Larry Martin's sister, who dates Alan while Larry is with Lyndsey (season 11)(also worked with Courtney Thorne-Smith on ABC's According to Jim as her TV sister)
 Maggie Lawson as Ms. McMartin, Walden and Alan's social worker for Louis' adoption (season 12)

 Guest stars 
Guest stars have included:

 Aisha Tyler as an adoption lawyer to whom Walden goes when he wants a child (season 12, episode 1)(also 2nd host of Whose Line Is It Anyway? with Ryan Stiles as an improv contestant)
 Alicia Witt as Dolores Pasternak, Jake's teacher who becomes a stripper (season 6)
 Allison Janney as Beverly, Alan's online dating partner (season 4)
 Amy Hill as Mrs. Wiggins, Alan's receptionist after Melissa leaves him (season 7)
 Annie Potts as Lenore, mother of Judith and Liz (season 7)
 Arnold Schwarzenegger as Lieutenant Wagner ("Of Course He's Dead", series finale)
 Brad Paisley as Gretchen Martin's fiancé, before she broke it off to date Alan [real-life husband of Kimberly Williams-Paisley, who played Gretchen]
 Brenda Koo as Julie (season 12, episode 7)
 Brit Morgan as a girl Walden picks up at a bar (season 10, episode 1)
 Brooke Shields as Danielle, Charlie and Alan's neighbor (season 4)
 Camryn Manheim as Daisy, Berta's sister (season 2)
 Carol Kane as Shelly, Melissa's mother (season 6)
 Chris O'Donnell as Jill/Bill, Charlie's ex-girlfriend who since became a man (season 1, episode 18)
 Christian Slater as himself (series finale)
 Christina Moore as Cynthia Sullivan, Judith's best friend (season 5)
 Chuck Lorre as himself, the program's producer ("Of Course He's Dead", series finale)
 Cloris Leachman as Norma, Charlie and Alan's neighbor, Alan's "sugar momma" and Charlie's former "sugar momma" (season 3)
 Deanna Russo as Laurel (season 12, episode 7)
 Denise Richards as Lisa, Charlie's former girlfriend (season 1, episode 10; season 2, episode 9) [then-wife of Charlie Sheen]
 Diedrich Bader as Dirk, a Denver pawn-shop owner (season 11, episode 21) (friend of Ryan Stiles and co-creator of Buzz Beer on The Drew Carey Show)
 Diora Baird as Wanda, a girl who chases after Charlie when he is engaged to Chelsea (season 6, episode 16)
 Eddie Van Halen as himself (season 7, episode 1)
 Elvis Costello as himself, Charlie's support, whisky and cigar group buddy (season 2, episode 1)
 Emilio Estevez as Andy, Charlie's long-time friend who dies before him (season 6, episode 11) [real-life brother of Sheen]
 Emily Osment as Ashley, Jake's girlfriend (season 10, episode 20)
 Emily Rose as Janine (season 6, episode 12)
 Enrique Iglesias as Fernando, Charlie's carpenter/handyman (season 4, episode 23)
 Eric Allan Kramer as Bill (season 1)
 Erinn Hayes as Gretchen, a one-night stand of Alan's (season 8, episode 5)
 Fire Ice as Rapper Cool Dawgie
 Frances Fisher as Priscilla Honeycutt, Alan's patient (season 7, episode 19)
 Gail O'Grady as Mandi, mother of Kandi, ex-wife of Andy and brief love interest of Charlie (season 3)
 Garry Marshall as Garry, one of Marty's friends (season 11, episode 13)
 Gary Busey as himself, Alan's roommate in a sanitarium (season 9)
 Georgia Engel as Jean, Lyndsey's mother (season 9, episodes 19–20)
 Harry Dean Stanton as himself, Charlie's support, whisky and cigar group buddy (season 2, episode 1)
 Heather Locklear as Laura Lang, Alan's divorce attorney (season 1, episode 21)
 Hilary Duff as Stacy, a ditzy one-night stand of Walden's (season 10, episode 23)
 Ion Overman as Vicki, Charlie Waffles' supermarket pick-up (season 5, episode 8)
 Iqbal Theba as Don, a taxi driver who Charlie insults (season 6, episode 13) 
 Jack Plotnick as Mike (season 5)
 Jaime Pressly as Tammy, Jake's cougar girlfriend (season 10)
 James Earl Jones as himself (season 6, episode 11)
 Jason Marshall Alexander as Dr. Goodman, Alan's doctor (season 9, episode 23)
 Jeff Probst as himself, Walden and Alan's love rival (season 11)
 Jenna Elfman as Frankie (season one, episodes 15 and 16) and as Dharma (season 9, episode 1)
 Jeri Ryan as Sherri, Charlie's and later Alan's girlfriend (season 2, episodes 5 and 19; season 9, episode 1)
 Jessica Collins as Gloria, one of Charlie's one-night stands, who may be  Alan and his sister (season 4, episode 11)
 Jodi Lyn O'Keefe as Isabella (season 3, episode 6)
 John Amos as Ed, boyfriend of Chelsea's father Tom (season 7)
 John Stamos as himself, a prospective buyer of the beach house before Walden purchases it, who later returns in the finale where he is about to sleep with Bridget (seasons 9 and 12)
 Jon Lovitz as Archie Baldwin, Charlie's nemesis to win the advertising jingle award (season 3, episode 17)
 Josie Davis as Sandy, a girlfriend of Alan's (season 3)
 Judd Nelson as Chris McElroy, ex-husband of Alan's love interest, Lyndsey, and Eldridge's father (season 8)
 Julia Campbell as Francine, Jake's teacher (season 3)
 Kate Miner as Nadine Hore (season 11, episode 9)
 Katherine LaNasa as Lydia, Charlie's oedipal girlfriend and Evelyn's doppelgänger (season 4, episodes 6 and 10)
 Kathy Bates as "Charlie" in the afterlife (season 9, episode 22)
 Katy Mixon as Betsy, a married woman whom Charlie purports to marry after his break-up with Chelsea (season 7, episodes 7 and 16) (also former co-star of American Housewife with Diedrich Bader as his TV wife)
 Ken Jeong as a male nurse (season 2, episode 17)
 Kevin Sorbo as Andy, father of Kandi, ex-husband of Mandi and brief love interest of Judith (season 3)
 Kris Iyer as Dr. Prajneep (season 1, episode 17; season 4, episode 16; season 5, episode 1)
 Liz Vassey as Michelle (seasons 8–9)
 Lucy Lawless as Pamela, the ex-wife of the gay ad executive (season 2, episode 18 "It was Mame, Mom")
 Lynda Carter as herself (season 11)
 Marilu Henner as Linda, Walden's older, more mature love interest (season 10, episode 23)
 Martin Sheen as Harvey, Rose's father and Evelyn's fling (season 3) [real-life father of Charlie Sheen]
 Meagen Fay as Martha Melini, Chelsea's mother (seasons 6–7)
 Megan Fox as Prudence, Berta's granddaughter (season 1, episode 12)
 Michael Bolton as himself, a friend of Walden's who is occasionally hired to serenade Walden's love interests (seasons 10 and 12)
 Michael Clarke Duncan as Jerome Burnette, a retired football player, Charlie and Alan's neighbor and the father of Celeste Burnette (season 6)
 Mike Conners as Hugo, a brief love interest of Evelyn (season 4, episode 24)
 Mila Kunis as Vivian, a free-spirit hiker (season 11, episode 19) [real-life wife of Ashton Kutcher and fellow That '70s Show co-star]
 Morgan Fairchild as Donna (Charlie's ego) (season 4, episode 16)
 Nadia Bjorlin as Jill, a young woman who sleeps with Russell, and Evelyn's one-time lover (season 8)
 Orson Bean as Norman, an old man whose trophy wife had sex with Charlie (season 2, episode 23)
 Paget Brewster as Jamie Eckleberry, Charlie and Alan's high-school classmate (season 2, episode 12)
 Rena Sofer as Chrissy, the "mother" of Charlie's "son" (season 6, episode 1)
 Richard Kind as Artie, Charlie's manager (season 5, episode 8)
 Richard Lewis as Stan, Charlie's accountant (season 1, episode 14)
 Sara Erikson as Jennifer, Jake's one-time, older girlfriend (season 9, episode 17)
 Sara Rue as Naomi, Berta's daughter (season 4)
 Sean Penn as himself, Charlie's support, whisky and cigar group buddy (season 2, episode 1)
 Stacy Keach as Tom Melini, Chelsea's father (season 7)
 Stephanie Jacobsen as Penelope, Charlie's former lover who visits the house after Walden moves in (season 9, episode 2)
 Steve Lawrence as Steve, one of Marty's friends (season 11, episode 13)
 Steven Eckholdt as Brad, Alan's lawyer and Chelsea's replacement for Charlie (season 7)
 Steven Tyler as himself, Charlie and Alan's neighbor and Berta's one-time employer (season 1, episode 4; season 4, episode 2)
 Susan Blakely as Angie, an author Charlie met at a bookstore (season 5, episodes 18 and 19)
 Taylor Cole as Melanie Laughlin (season 9)
 Teri Hatcher as Liz, Judith's sister (season 1, episode 19)
 Thomas Gibson as Greg (season 9, episode 1)
 Tim Conway as Tim, one of Marty's friends (season 11, episode 13)
 Tinashe Kachingwe as Celeste Burnette, Jake's ex-girlfriend (seasons 6–7)
 Tony Tripoli as Phillip, Evelyn's hairdresser (season 4)
 Tricia Helfer as Gail, Chelsea's friend (seasons 7 and 9)
 Wayne Wilderson as Roger, Evelyn's co-worker (season 4)
 Willie Garson as Dr. Steven Staven, Lyndsey's gynecologist who takes her out on a date (season 10, episode 14)
 ZZ Top as themselves

As part of a crossover from the writers and executive producer of CSI: Crime Scene Investigation, George Eads made a brief cameo appearance on the May 5, 2008, episode.

Charlie Sheen's real-life brother Emilio Estevez has guest-starred as an old friend of Charlie's; his father Martin Sheen has appeared as Rose's father. Sam Sheen, the real-life daughter of Denise Richards and Charlie Sheen, appeared as Lisa's daughter on November 22, 2004. Mila Kunis, Ashton Kutcher's fiancée and later wife, appeared on the show as his love interest in season 11.

 Broadcast 

 Episodes 

Each episode's title is a dialogue fragment from the episode itself, usually offering no clue to the episode's actual plotline. The show's 100th episode ("City of Great Racks") aired on October 15, 2007. To celebrate this, a casino-inspired party was held at West Hollywood's Pacific Design Center. Warner Bros. Television also distributed blue Micargi Rover bicycles adorned with the Two and a Half Men logo along with the words "100 Episodes". Each bicycle came with a note saying, "You've made us very proud. Here's to a long ride together." The cast also gave the crew sterling silver key rings from Tiffany & Co. The key rings were attached to small pendants with "100" inscribed on one side and Two and a Half Men on the other.

Seasons one through four, six and nine consist of 24 episodes. Season five was reduced to 19 episodes due to the 2007–2008 Writers Guild of America strike. Due to Sheen's personal life problems, season seven had 22 episodes. Season eight premiered on September 20, 2010, at 9:00 pm ET. CBS initially ordered 24 episodes for the season, but again due to Sheen's personal life, the show was put on hiatus after 16 episodes were produced, with production scheduled to resume on February 28. After a series of comments made by Sheen on February 24, 2011, CBS and Warner Bros. cancelled the remainder of the season.

On May 13, 2011, actor Ashton Kutcher was widely reported to be replacing Charlie Sheen as the lead on the show. The show's ninth season premiered on September 19, 2011. The first episode, "Nice to Meet You, Walden Schmidt", begins with Charlie Harper's funeral and introduces Kutcher as billionaire Walden Schmidt, who buys Harper's house.  On May 12, 2012, CBS renewed Two and a Half Men for a 10th season, moving it to Thursday nights at 8:30 pm, following The Big Bang Theory.  For the 2013–14 season, the show was moved to the Thursday 9:30–10:00 pm Eastern slot. As of February 27, 2014, the series' time slot was moved to a half-hour earlier at the 9:00–9:30 slot.

 Syndication and streamingTwo and a Half Men entered local United States broadcast syndication in 2007, with the first four seasons available to local stations (largely CW affiliates in the major U.S. television markets through major deals with Tribune Broadcasting and the Sinclair Broadcast Group). From September 6, 2010, to November 24, 2017, FX aired the series daily nationwide (Charlie Sheen most recently starred on Anger Management on the same network from 2012 to 2014). Syndicated shows are sold in multiyear cycles, with the first cycle the most expensive. Two and a Half Men's first cycle is nine years in length. If no ninth season had occurred because of Sheen's departure, due to the first cycle's premature end, Warner Bros. would not have received about $80 million in license fees. While local stations would prefer to have as many episodes as possible available to them, an early start to the second cycle would lower the cost of the show for them. The series began airing on Viacom-owned networks Nick at Nite and Paramount Network (at the time still called Spike) in December 2017 and on IFC on January 1, 2018. As of July 2, 2018, the series has moved from Nick at Nite to TV Land, switching places with Mom. As of August 6, 2019, the series has started airing on AMC.

The show is available in the US for streaming on Peacock.

 Crossovers and other appearances 

 CSI: Crime Scene Investigation 
In 2007, Two and a Half Men creator Chuck Lorre contacted CSI: Crime Scene Investigation executive producer Carol Mendelsohn about a crossover. At first, the idea seemed unlikely to receive approval; however, it resurfaced when Mendelsohn and Lorre were at the World Television Festival in Canada and they decided to get approval and run with it.  When Mendelsohn was giving a talk, she accidentally mentioned the crossover, that same day Variety was already inquiring about the crossover episodes. Mendelsohn later stated: "We're all used to being in control and in charge of our own shows and even though this was a freelance-type situation ... there was an expectation and also a desire on all of our parts to really have a true collaboration. You have to give a little. It was sort of a life lesson, I think."

"The biggest challenge for us was doing a comedy with a murder in it. Generally, our stories are a little lighter," stated Lorre in an interview. "Would our audience go with a dead body in it? There was a moment where it could have gone either way. I think the results were spectacular. It turned out to be a really funny episode." The Two and a Half Men episode "Fish in a Drawer" was the first part of the crossover to air, on May 5, 2008, written by CSI writers Sarah Goldfinger, Evan Dunsky, Carol Mendelsohn and Naren Shankar. George Eads is the only CSI: Crime Scene Investigation cast member to make a cameo in this episode.

Three days later, the second part of the crossover aired, the CSI episode "Two and a Half Deaths". Gil Grissom (William Petersen) investigated the murder of a sitcom diva named Annabelle (Katey Sagal), who was found murdered while she was filming her show in Las Vegas. The episode was written by Two and a Half Men creators Lorre and Aronsohn; Sheen, Cryer and Jones all make uncredited cameos in this episode, in the same clothes their characters were wearing in "Fish in a Drawer".

 Due Date 
At the end of 2010 film Due Date, a scene from Two and a Half Men is shown, in which  Sheen and Cryer appear as their characters, while Ethan Chase (played by Zach Galifianakis in the movie) plays Stu, Jake's tutor.

 Reception 

Critical reception
Although the series was successful, Two and a Half Men received mostly mixed reviews from critics throughout its run. The New York Daily News has described the sitcom as "solid, well-acted and occasionally funny." Conversely Graeme Blundell, writing for The Australian, described it as a "sometimes creepy, misogynistic comedy". Ashton Kutcher's debut was met with mixed reviews, and reviews for season nine were also mixed.
However, it has been labeled as "one of America's most successful comedy shows." Ellen Gray of Daily News praised the shows' legacy just before the premiere of the finale. The show is credited as being the reason The Big Bang Theory, Mike & Molly and Mom were all made. Mens success was what enabled these other Chuck Lorre shows to be made and be successful.
Following the filming of the final episode, Stage 26 of the Warner Brothers lot was renamed the "Two and a Half Men stage".
After the finale, Two and a Half Men fans launched a global petition under the name "Yes To The Harpers", to have Charlie Sheen reprise the role of Charlie Harper alongside his former co-star Jon Cryer. This idea surfaced after fans saw Chuck Lorre's vanity card about Charlie Sheen's idea of a spinoff show named The Harpers.

However, on Metacritic, the series has a weighted average score of 67 out of 100, which stands for "generally favorable reviews".

 Ratings 

 American television ratings 
Seasonal rankings (based on average total viewers per episode) of Two and a Half Men on CBS:Note: Each U.S. network television season starts in late September and ends in late May, which coincides with the completion of May sweeps. Awards and nominations 

The show received multiple award nominations. It was nominated for 46 Primetime Emmy Awards (winning nine, including two for Jon Cryer) and two Golden Globe Awards (both for Charlie Sheen). The show won the award for Favorite TV Comedy at the 35th People's Choice Awards.

 Home media 

 Potential revival 
When Sheen appeared on the April 2019 broadcast of Loose Women'', he expressed interest in a potential revival, hoping to make two more seasons to tie up loose characters ends. In response, Jon Cryer expressed reluctance to return to working with Sheen full time, comparing it to a roller coaster.

Notes

References

External links

Two and a Half Men at Warner TV

List of Two and a Half Men Episodes at TV Guide
Two and a Half Men on Comedy Central UK
Vanity cards archive for Two and a Half Men at chucklorre.com

 
2003 American television series debuts
2015 American television series endings
2000s American LGBT-related comedy television series
2000s American sex comedy television series
2000s American sitcoms
2010s American LGBT-related comedy television series
2010s American sex comedy television series
2010s American sitcoms
Casual sex in television
Obscenity controversies in television
CBS original programming
English-language television shows
Nudity in television
Primetime Emmy Award-winning television series
Television controversies in the United States
Television series about brothers
Television series about dysfunctional families
Television series by Warner Bros. Television Studios
Television series created by Chuck Lorre
Television shows set in Malibu, California
Television shows filmed in Los Angeles
American LGBT-related sitcoms
Warner Bros. Television Studios franchises